Palpidia is a genus of moths in the family Erebidae. The genus was erected by Harrison Gray Dyar Jr. in 1898.

Taxonomy
The genus was previously classified in the subfamily Calpinae of the family Noctuidae.

Species
Palpidia cocophaga (Franclemont, 1949) Cuba
Palpidia melanotricha Hampson, 1907 Jamaica
Palpidia pallidior Dyar, 1898 Florida

References

Moth genera
Scolecocampinae